Kevin Riehl (born March 11, 1971 in Leader, Saskatchewan) is a Canadian retired ice hockey centre.

Career
Riehl was drafted 231st overall by the New Jersey Devils in the 1991 NHL Entry Draft, but never managed to play in the NHL. Instead, he played in the International Hockey League for the Cincinnati Cyclones, the American Hockey League for the Utica Devils and Albany River Rats and the East Coast Hockey League for the Birmingham Bulls and the Raleigh IceCaps.

Beginning in 1995, Riehl played in Europe, beginning two years in Germany's 2nd Bundesliga for Iserlohner EC where he scored 168 points in 93 games including 85 goals. He then spent two seasons in Italy's Serie A before moving to the United Kingdom in 1999 where he joined the Bracknell Bees of the British Ice Hockey Superleague. He won the Superleague Championship in that season with the Bees and was named into the BISL First-All Star team.

He was then one of seven players to leave the Bees, alongside head coach Dave Whistle, to join the newly formed Belfast Giants in Northern Ireland. He spent three seasons with the Giants, winning his second Superleague title in 2002 in only the Giants' second season of operations, as well as the playoff championship in 2003. He returned to North America in the 2003-04 season, joining the Bakersfield Condors of the ECHL before playing once more in Italy, retiring from hockey in 2005.

References

External links

1971 births
Bakersfield Condors (1998–2015) players
Belfast Giants players
Birmingham Bulls (ECHL) players
Bracknell Bees players
Canadian ice hockey centres
Cincinnati Cyclones (IHL) players
HC Alleghe players
HC Milano Saima players
Ice hockey people from Saskatchewan
Iserlohn Roosters players
Living people
Medicine Hat Tigers players
New Jersey Devils draft picks
Raleigh IceCaps players
Utica Devils players
People from Rural Municipality Happyland No. 231, Saskatchewan